The Kentucky Fried Movie is a 1977 American independent sketch comedy film, produced by Kim Jorgensen, Larry Kostroff, and Robert K. Weiss, and directed by John Landis. Among the numerous star cameos are George Lazenby, Bill Bixby, Henry Gibson, Barry Dennen, Donald Sutherland, Tony Dow, Stephen Bishop, and the voice of Shadoe Stevens. According to writer David Zucker on the DVD commentary track, David Letterman auditioned for the role of the newscaster, but was not selected. The film also features many former members of The Groundlings and The Second City. The "feature presentation" portion of the film stars Evan C. Kim and hapkido grand master Bong Soo Han. The Kentucky Fried Movie marked the first film appearances of a number of actors who later became famous, and launched the careers of the Zucker brothers, Abrahams and Landis.

Landis was recommended to direct National Lampoon's Animal House in 1978 based on his work with The Kentucky Fried Movie.

The film's writers were the team of David Zucker, Jim Abrahams and Jerry Zucker, who subsequently wrote and directed Airplane!, Top Secret! and the Police Squad! television series and its film spin-offs, The Naked Gun films.

Content
The Kentucky Fried Movie contains largely unconnected sketches that parody various film genres, including exploitation films. The film's longest segment spoofs early kung-fu films, specifically Enter the Dragon; its title, A Fistful of Yen, refers to A Fistful of Dollars. Parodies of disaster films ("That's Armageddon"), blaxploitation films ("Cleopatra Schwartz"), and softcore porn/women-in-prison films ("Catholic High School Girls in Trouble") are presented as "Coming Attraction" trailers. The fictional films are produced by "Samuel L. Bronkowitz" (a conflation of Samuel Bronston and Joseph L. Mankiewicz, but also a spoof of B-movie producer and American International Pictures co-founder Samuel Z. Arkoff). The sketch "See You Next Wednesday" mocks theater-based gimmicks like Sensurround by depicting a dramatic film presented in "Feel-a-Round", which involves an usher physically accosting a theater patron. Other sketches spoof TV commercials and programs, news broadcasts, and classroom educational films. The city of Detroit and its high crime rate are a running gag portraying the city as a hell on Earth; in "A Fistful of Yen", the evil drug lord orders a captured CIA agent to be sent to Detroit, and the agent screams and begs to be killed instead but the villain ignores him and sends him on his way to Michigan.

Sketches
The credits list the sketches incorrectly, as the writers changed the show order after the credits had been written. On second cut, they corrected this error. The following list is in the running order used in the film:

{| class="wikitable" width=100% 
! colspan=2 | Sketch details
|-
| width=20% |
11 O'Clock News (Part 1) (:04)
|A news announcer tells the film's viewers the popcorn they are eating has been urinated in...Film at 11.
|-
|Argon Oil (1:13)
|A commercial for a company that found ways to produce oil from acne, Italian people's hair (taken from combs in their trash), and American fast food.
|-
|A.M. Today (6:05)
|A morning TV news show with hosts (Janice Kent and Michael Laurence) and several segments: a news correspondent, unable to hear the announcers, scratches his buttocks and picks his nose on-camera, and a studio debate between two conservative and liberal pundits ends in an obscene personal attack. The show's astrologer declares that astrology is meant to support people who cannot take responsibility for their own lives. An animal segment introduces a rare hamster followed by a gorilla (Rick Baker). The gorilla, which has been unable to mate, becomes progressively enraged by its female handler's explanations, goes berserk, and tears off her shirt. Studio hands try unsuccessfully to restrain the gorilla as it runs amok and finally smashes the camera.
|-
|His New Car (:24)
|When a man enters a car, multiple alarms sound. As he goes through a succession of actions (locking his door, buckling his seatbelt, and so on) the alarms shut off one by one until only one remains. Eventually he reaches down and zips the fly on his jeans. The last alarm then stops.
|-
|Catholic High School Girls in Trouble (2:00)
|A parody of sexploitation films, including a topless conversation among three young, large-breasted "Catholic high school girls" (Nancy Mann, Lenka Novak and Betsy Genson). Later, the school punishes them for breaking curfew by locking them in a jail where they are stripped naked except for brightly colored bikini bottoms. With their wrists chained above them, they face the camera bare-breasted as their backs are whipped by a dwarf in a clown suit. Another scene shows Uschi Digard's large breasts being heavily fondled by a man (with squeaky-balloon sound effects) and later comically squashed against a shower door when he penetrates her from behind. In the following scene, a shocked teenager interrupts his intercourse when he realizes it is actually his girlfriend's middle-aged mother in bed with him (she happily announces to the camera that people always mistake her for her teenaged daughter). Lastly, another teenager learns in horror that masturbation has made his hands hairy.
|-
|(See You Next Wednesday in) Feel-A-Round (4:52)
|A man watches a movie presented in "Feel-A-Round." In the lobby appears a poster for the Landis film, Schlock. The usher takes the role of the on-screen female lover. As she asks her male lover to smell her perfume, the usher sprays the viewer with said perfume. It eventually proceeds to chest rubbing and then to a quarrel. The latter culminates with a knife to the throat, but ends with a quick kiss. The cinema's announcer invites the man to also stay over for the next film – Deep Throat. As the usher grins, the viewer runs away screaming.
|-
|Nytex P.M. (:35)
|A commercial for a drug that cures headaches by rendering the purchaser unconscious.
|-
|
High Adventure (3:01)
|A talk show's boom operator uses a boom mike to cause on-air problems for both the guest and the host.
|-
|11 O'Clock News (Part 2) (:05)
|Moscow is "in flames" and missiles are headed for New York...Film at 11.
|-
|Headache Clinic (:40)
|A commercial hosted by Bill Bixby shows a clinic's scientists demonstrating their headache-curing drug Sanhedrin by pounding on people's heads. The commercial claims the people are not affected by the pain.
|-
|Household Odors (:40)
|A commercial for household deodorizer that claims that if you do not buy it, guests will tell you that your house smells terrible in a variety of humiliating ways.
|-
|The Wonderful World of Sex (4:55)
|A couple plays a phonograph record of a how-to guide for sex. After the couple disrobe, the record instructs them to kiss and begin foreplay. After the male experiences premature ejaculation, the recording sends Big Jim Slade, a briefs-wearing, muscular "tight end for the Kansas City Chiefs" to carry the woman away and finish her humiliated partner's job, backed by a vigorous choral rendition of the song "Heiveinu Shalom Aleichem."
|-
|A Fistful of Yen (31:34)
|One missile from the previously announced (Film at 11) dual U.S.S.R/U.S. attack is revealed to be Chinese-made. The Chinese government denies any involvement. The mastermind behind the attack turns out to be a Chinese Dark Lord named Dr. Klahn (Han Bong-soo). In a parody of Enter the Dragon, the U.K. government hires Loo (Evan C. Kim playing a Bruce Lee lookalike who speaks like Elmer Fudd) to penetrate Dr. Klahn's mountain fortress and destroy his operation. Loo refuses the mission at first but happily agrees when told that he can kill dozens of people. The fortress is so organized that it even has its own guided tours for its storage of drugs and weapons of mass destruction. When Loo is discovered, he defeats waves of thugs before he is captured by Dr. Klahn. The next morning, Loo defeats Dr. Klahn's bodyguard Bulkus in a deathmatch, forcing the tyrant to order his underlings to kill Loo. Meanwhile, Big Jim Slade appears and frees the fortress' prisoners, who rush to engage in battle as well. Loo confronts and kills Dr. Klahn with a bucket of water. In an homage to The Wizard of Oz, Loo is sent back to Kansas after his victory and learns that it may have all been a dream.
|-
|Willer Beer (:58)
|A beer commercial featuring Hare Krishna monks.
|-
|11 O'Clock News (Part 3) (:05)
|Rams plagued by fumbles as earthquake rocks Los Angeles...Film at 11
|-
|Scot Free (:58)
|A commercial for a board game based on US president John F. Kennedy assassination conspiracy theories.
|-
|That's Armageddon (2:17)
|A parody of the then-common disaster film genre, with Donald Sutherland as the clumsy waiter and George Lazenby as the architect.
|-
|United Appeal for the Dead (1:42)
|A commercial featuring Henry Gibson for an association that supports keeping around corpses of dead people and still treating them like part of the family.
|-
|"Courtroom" (Part 1) (4:35)
|A spoof of a courtroom trial that takes every word literally and runs like a game show while "The Beaver" (writer Jerry Zucker) and Wally Cleaver (Tony Dow, reprising his role from the original Leave It to Beaver) get into trouble in the jury stand.
|-
|Nesson Oil (:14)
|A commercial for cooking oil in which a little girl is "cooking the cat in pure Nesson oil".
|-
|Courtroom (Part 2) (3:02)
|Beaver and Wally continue to make trouble, while the trial's "surprise" witness recognizes the TV announcer himself as the offender in a car accident.
|-
|Cleopatra Schwartz (1:24)
|A parody of blaxploitation films: A love and marriage story of a Pam Grier–like character (Marilyn Joi) and a rabbi (Saul Kahan). Despite their differences, they live a passionate life (highlighted by the couple sitting in bed with satisfied expressions, with her topless).
|-
|Zinc Oxide and You (1:59)
|A parody of classroom educational films (like A Case of Spring Fever from The Jam Handy Organization), it shows what happens to a housewife who has everything, who relies on zinc oxide; her possessions disappear or malfunction one by one, with increasingly undesirable results. Among other things, her bra disappears, and her breasts instantly sag under her shirt. Her car crashes through her house as it has no brakes, and her husband's pacemaker stops working. Eventually, the gas control valves on her stove disappear, her kitchen catches on fire, and everything that can stop the fire also disappears. The segment ends with a brief announcement of a later film in the series, Rebuilding Your Home.
|-
|Danger Seekers (1:02)
|A parody of the 1973–1974 television series, Thrill Seekers: Part-time airline mechanic, full-time daredevil Rex Kramer (Robert Starr) vows to take on the most dangerous situations possible "for the sake of adventure". Rex, wearing protective gear, walks to the middle of a group of African-American men playing Cee-lo in an alley and screams the racial epithet "Niggers!" whereupon he flees as they angrily pursue him. (The name Rex Kramer would later be given to Robert Stack's character in Airplane!.) 
|-
|Eyewitness News (4:24)
|A couple stops watching the TV news to have sex. In a parody of Nineteen Eighty-Four'''s two-way television, as soon as the man exposes the woman's breasts, the TV news announcer starts stuttering. As the man performs cunnilingus on the woman, men from the production crew gather around the news announcer to gape and snicker. They scream when she reaches an orgasm, but the crew runs away in time when the suspicious couple stops and turns to look at the television. The news announcer hastily resumes his report. The couple resume having sex. This time the woman mounts the man. The men from the production crew return to the news announcer. They share a collective orgasm with the woman.
|-
|11 O'Clock News (Part 4) (:09)
|The news announcer declares he is not wearing any pants...Film at 11
|}

Notes

Production
Background
David Zucker, Jerry Zucker and Jim Abrahams made the rounds of the Hollywood studios with the concept and were rejected by all of them, being told, "audiences didn't like movies composed of sketches". Since the three believed in their material, which they had honed in front of the audiences with their improvisational troupe "Kentucky Fried Theater", they decided to make the movie on their own.

A wealthy real estate investor offered to finance the film if they would write a script. After completion of the screenplay, the investor had second thoughts and decided he did not want to finance the film alone. He said he would try to attract other investors if the three filmmakers would produce a 10-minute excerpt of the film, which he would finance. When the trio presented a budget of the short film to the investor, he backed out.

Filming
The prospect of shooting the short film so excited the trio that they decided to pay for it themselves. The 10-minute film cost $35,000, and with it they again approached the Hollywood studios. This time, they attached a young director named John Landis to the project, who came to their attention after an appearance on The Tonight Show promoting his first film Schlock. However, once again, the studios turned them down.

Distribution and release
Curious as to how audiences would react to their film, they persuaded exhibitor Kim Jorgensen to show it before one of his regularly scheduled films. When Jorgenson saw the short, he "fell out of his seat laughing." He was so impressed that he offered to raise the money needed to make the full-length version. By having his fellow exhibitors screen the film before audiences in their theaters, he convinced them to put up the $650,000 budget. When released, Kentucky Fried Movie was a box-office success, returning domestic American rentals of $7.1 million.

Home media
Anchor Bay Entertainment released a region 1 DVD in 2000. This release is presented in widescreen (1.85:1) aspect ratio and full-frame (1.33:1). It includes commentary by Landis; writers ZAZ; and producer Robert K. Weiss.

On July 4, 2011, Arrow Video in region 2 released a two-disc special edition DVD with the following special features:
 Feature presented in widescreen 1.85:1 and full-frame 1.33:1
 Original mono audio
 The audio recollections of director Landis; writers ZAZ; and producer Robert K. Weiss
 A conversation with David and Jerry Zucker: A feature length interview with the co-creators of The Kentucky Fried Movie, Airplane! and The Naked Gun about their lives and career, from growing up and starting out in show business to their comedy influences and spoofing Midnight Cowboy Jerry Zucker's on-set home video shot during the making of the movie
 Behind-the-scenes photo gallery
 Original trailer
 Four-panel reversible sleeve with original and newly commissioned artwork
 Double-sided fold-out artwork poster
 Collector's booklet featuring brand new writing on director Landis by critic and author Calum Waddell

On July 2, 2013, Shout! Factory released the film on Blu-ray in a 1.85:1 aspect widescreen transfer. This version includes the original theatrical trailer, Arrow DVD release filmmaker commentary, and Zucker Bros. interview.

Critical response
On Rotten Tomatoes the film has a score of 81% based on reviews from 32 critics. The site's critical consensus reads: "The now obscure pop culture references and spoofed commercials add to Kentucky Fried Movies anarchic, anything-goes spirit and wit." On Metacritic it has a score of 61% based on reviews from 10 critics, indicating "generally favorable reviews".

At the time, Variety described the film as having "excellent production values and some genuine wit" but also noted that film was juvenile and tasteless. Lawrence Van Gelder of The New York Times wrote, "Lots of people will probably like The Kentucky Fried Movie, just as they like Kentucky Fried Chicken and McDonald's hamburgers. But popularity is still no reason for deifying mediocrity." Gene Siskel of the Chicago Tribune gave the film two stars out of four and wrote that the best moments were "one-joke gags; its writers can't sustain their humor for longer pieces. So, what you're left with is a half-dozen decent gags, one overlong karate flick, and a few shots of bare breasts thrown in to titillate teenage boys." Gary Arnold of The Washington Post called it "a diverting hit-and-miss satirical anthology." Kevin Thomas of the Los Angeles Times wrote, "As is inevitable in such undertakings there are some sophomoric moments, but on the whole 'Kentucky Fried Movie' is, amazingly enough, almost continually funny in its ribald way."

Writing three decades later in 2008, Ian Nathan of Empire magazine calls the film "occasionally funny"... "in a scattershot and puerile way", and he concludes the film is "smart and satirical, but very dated".  J. C. Maçek III of PopMatters wrote, "The Kentucky Fried Movie is, however, profane, experimental, violent, silly, hilarious, and occasionally quite sexually explicit (all of which surely helped its success over the years)."

The film ranks number 87 on Bravo's 100 Funniest Movies list.

See also

 Amazon Women on the Moon Disco Beaver from Outer Space Everything You Always Wanted to Know About Sex* The Groove Tube Tunnel Vision UHF Robot Chicken Loose Shoes The Onion Movie Movie 43''
 List of films featuring fictional films

References

External links

 
 

1977 films
1977 independent films
1977 comedy films
1977 martial arts films
1970s English-language films
1970s martial arts comedy films
1970s parody films
1970s sex comedy films
American anthology films
American independent films
American martial arts comedy films
American parody films
American sex comedy films
Films directed by John Landis
Films shot in Los Angeles
Films with screenplays by Jim Abrahams
Films with screenplays by Jerry Zucker
Films with screenplays by David Zucker (filmmaker)
Sketch comedy films
Films produced by Kim Jorgensen
Films produced by Robert K. Weiss
Films about the assassination of John F. Kennedy
1970s American films